Lubomir Tsvetanov Kirov is a Bulgarian pop singer and music producer. He was formerly the lead singer of the band Te and was a member of the jury in the second and third season of music show X Factor.

Early life
Kirov was born in Pleven, Bulgaria and graduated from the National Academy of Arts.

Career 
Kirov was a some-time drummer for the Doom Metal group Mortal Remains, and later became part of the group Mr. White, which recorded the single "Something funny."

From 2000 to 2007 he was part of the group TE who released two albums – "Pronouns" and "Different" containing songs including "Are there flowers" "I'll find you", "I", "All Right" ( with Maria Ilieva) "other". TE was awarded the First Prize at the International Media Festival "Albena" in the "Concerts" for the realization of "TE Unplugged" DVD. During the same period, Kirov participated in music events including concerts Simply Red, Incognito, Al McKay's Earth Wind And Fire Experience, Simple Minds. The group took part in various initiatives and campaigns including "Sport against drugs" and "Bulgaria in the EU" in Brussels.

In the spring of 2007 Lubo left the band TE and launched his solo career. His first solo single – "Again, I believe" – won the radio competition "Golden Spring". In 2010 Lubo released his first solo album, "Lubo 2010" which includes songs "I Can", "Govori Mi na Ti" "You and I" (with people from the ghetto), "Na Kraya na Sveta", "Forbidden love" (as the eponymous series of New TV), and "Tonight" (with Italian singer Alessia D'Andrea).

Kirov has participated as guest vocalist in various musical projects. His joint project with Zhivko Petrov, "Life is beautiful" became quite popular with its video reaching over 1 million views.

Since 2021, Kirov has been a judge on The Voice of Bulgaria.

Filmography

Discography 
 Pronouns (2001) – Pop Different
 Different (2003) – Pop
 Te Unplugged (2005) -Pop, Live
 Lubo 2010 (2010) – Pop, by "Lubo Productions"
 Life Is Beautiful (2011) – by Lubo & JP, Dance/House
 I Can't Get Over (2012) – Mr.Moon & Lubo Kirov, чрез "Stimulated Soul Recordings"

Awards 

 2014– Artist of the Year (БГ радио)
2012 – Best Artist (Artist of the Year)(БГ радио)
2007 – Best Song (BNR)
2005 – Best Group(БГ радио)
2004 – Best live performance (BG Radio)
2003 – Best Group (Melo TV Mania Music Awards)
2003 – Best Music (Melo TV Mania Music Awards)
2002 – Super Group Bulgaria (БГ радио)
2002 – Best Group (Bulgarian TOP 100 Music Awards)
2001 – Best Newcomer (Melo TV Mania Music Awards)

References

External links 
Official website

Bulgarian pop singers
1972 births
Living people
21st-century Bulgarian male singers
X Factor (Bulgarian TV series)
Musicians from Pleven